Adam Stewart (born 21 February 1987) is a New Zealand male  track cyclist, riding for the national team. He competed in the team sprint event at the 2010 UCI Track Cycling World Championships.

References

External links
 
 
 
 

1987 births
Living people
New Zealand track cyclists
New Zealand male cyclists
Place of birth missing (living people)
Cyclists at the 2006 Commonwealth Games
Commonwealth Games competitors for New Zealand
21st-century New Zealand people